Pycnarmon decipiens is a moth in the family Crambidae. It was described by Eugene G. Munroe in 1958. It is found on Mindanao in the Philippines.

References

Spilomelinae
Moths described in 1958
Moths of Asia